Cosmocampus howensis (Lord Howe pipefish) is a species of marine fish of the family Syngnathidae. It is found in the South Pacific from Jervis Bay (New South Wales, Australia) to Easter Island. It is expected to feed on small crustaceans, similar to other pipefishes. This species is ovoviviparous, with males carrying eggs before giving birth to live young.

Identifying features
This species has a blotchy brown body, occasionally marked with dark speckles and pale bars.

References

howensis
Marine fish
Taxa named by Gilbert Percy Whitley
Fish described in 1948